Mao Arukwe Ohuabunwa  (born 24 May 1957) is a Nigerian politician, businessman and a former Senator who represented Abia North Senatorial District in the 8th National Assembly having served in the 4th and 5th National Assembly as Member representing Arochukwu/Ohafia constituency of Abia State under the People's Democratic Party between 1999 and 2007.

Early life and education
Mao Arukwe Ohuabunwa was born in Port Harcourt, Rivers State on 24 May 1957 to parents who were business people at Atani a town in Arochukwu local government area of Abia State. He attended Orevo State School where he completed his primary education and Enitona High School, Borokiri where he completed his senior school education. He went on to obtain an HND and B.Tech in Applied Biology and Microbiology respectively from Rivers State University of Science and Technology. He also went on to attend Enugu State University of Science and Technology where he obtained his PGD and M.Sc certificates in Public Administration and Human Resources Management respectively.

Politics
In 1998, having made a huge success in his business over the years he then ventured into politics, Senator Mao ran for a seat in the Nigerian Federal House of Representatives under the umbrella of the United Nigeria Congress Party and won, before the process was truncated.

He became the first person to represent both Arochukwu/Ohafia constituency when he yet again contested and won in the 1999 elections this time under the umbrella of the People's Democratic Party and was subsequently elected the Deputy Leader of the House of Representatives. He went on to contest for a seat to represent Abia North in the Nigeria Senate in the 2007 general elections under the People's Democratic Party (PDP) and lost, but undeterred he went ahead and contested in the 2015 general election which he won and also won March 6, 2016 re-run after the Appeal Court annulled his earlier victory.

Mao was defeated in the 2019 Nigerian General Elections, losing the seat to Chief Orji Uzor Kalu

Personal life
Mao is married to Lady Barr. Nimi Faith Ohuabunwa with whom he has children. He is also the founder of Mao Ohuabunwa Foundation.
He is the younger brother to Mazi Sam Ohuabunwa.

See also
 Nigerian National Assembly delegation from Abia

References

People from Abia State
Living people
Igbo politicians
Peoples Democratic Party members of the House of Representatives (Nigeria)
Rivers State University alumni
Enugu State University of Science and Technology alumni
United Nigeria Congress Party politicians
1957 births
Peoples Democratic Party members of the Senate (Nigeria)